Hans Brenner may refer to:

 Hans Brenner (actor) (1938–1998), Austrian actor
 Hans Brenner (swimmer) (born 1912), Swiss swimmer